The 2020 Singapore Community Shield (also known as the AIA Community Shield for sponsorship reasons) was the 8th edition of the Singapore Charity Shield held on 22 February 2020 at Jalan Besar Stadium, between 2019 Singapore Cup winner Tampines Rovers and Hougang United. Hougang replaces 2019 Singapore Premier League champions DPMM FC who skipped the game due to precautionary travel restrictions because of the coronavirus situation.

The Rovers won the Shield for a record fifth time after defeating Hougang United 3–0.

Match

Details

See also
2020 Singapore Premier League
2020 Singapore Cup
2020 Singapore League Cup

References

2020 in Singaporean football
2020 in Singapore